William Fields may refer to:

 William J. Fields, U.S. Representative and Governor of Kentucky
 William M. Fields, American qualitative investigator studying language, culture, and tools in non-human primates
 William Fields (rower), American rower and Olympic gold medalist
 William C. Fields (1804–1882), U.S. Representative from New York
 William A. Feilds (died 1898), American legislator in the Tennessee House of Representatives
 William Fields (politician) (~1810–1858), a Texan politician and author from North Carolina

See also
William Field (disambiguation)